Don Catalino Rodriguez Ancestral House, also known as Villa Sariaya, is one of the three houses declared by the National Historical Institute (Now called the National Historical Commission) of the Philippines as Heritage house in Sariaya, Quezon.  It was owned by  Don Catalino Rodriguez, Sariaya’s town Presidente (Mayor during the American occupation period) from 1908 to 1909. The house occupies an entire block near the church park. Its main entrance faces south along Calle Daliz and is bounded by Calle Rizal on the west and Quezon Avenue (formerly Calle Talavera) on the east. This house has already been transformed into a Museum and visitors can choose to wear period costumes for reasonable fees and pose for souvenir photos. Don Catalino Rodriguez Ancestral House is listed as one of the Ancestral Houses in the Philippines, under Region IV-A.

History

Villa Sariaya was built in 1922.  The house was said to be a place for important occasions during its heyday.  According to historical accounts, one of those events that were held in the house was in honor of President Manuel Quezon. Claro M. Recto, a native of Tiaong, Quezon, was also mentioned as one of the important guests who visited the house in one of its sponsored events.

In the 1990s, the house was restored to its former grandeur through the effort of Vicente Rodriguez,  one of the eight children of the owners.  
After Vicente Rodriguez, his fourth child Rebecca purchased and restored the house.  

Today, Villa Sariaya is owned by the Veloso Family.

Architectural features

The Don Catalino Rodriguez House or today known as Villa Sariaya was built in the style of Bahay na Bato, a 19th-century townhouse.  A bahay na bato, literally translated as stone house, is characterized by stone or brick supported lower level and a hard wooden upper level.  From the entrance, the grand staircase with wood balusters  is the main feature that greets every visitor.   The rooms of the house are finished with beautiful Art Nuoveau wall paintings and wood carvings while the bathrooms were equipped with European and American bathroom fixtures.  

The main receiving area on the second floor has high ceiling and is accented by intricately designed lattices.  All the big sliding windows of the second floor are decorated with colorful stained glasses with louvered panels. The louvered panels are installed to minimize the entry of sunlight during high noon.  At the east side of the house is a big veranda with a picturesque view of the town.  To complement the grandiose design of the mansion, original furniture and fixtures were imported from Europe and United States. It is said that expert carpenters from the province of Batangas and Pampanga used top-quality species of hardwood in finishing the interiors of the mansion.

At the exterior of the house, intricate carvings decorates the corbels, brackets and pilasters. A simple yet elegant roof parapet decorated with five pointed stars can be seen on the top of the house.

Gallery

References

Buildings and structures in Quezon
Architecture in the Philippines
Heritage Houses in the Philippines
Tourist attractions in Quezon